The Mummy Case (1985) is the third of a series of historical mystery novels written by Elizabeth Peters and featuring the character Amelia Peabody.

Plot summary

Amelia and her husband, Professor Radcliffe Emerson, return to Egypt for the 1894–95 season to excavate the ruined pyramids of Mazghunah, which pale in comparison to the nearby dig at Dahshoor – but that is all Emerson could get after annoying the Department of Antiquities. On this trip, the Emersons bring along their young son Walter (aka Ramses) and his cat Bastet, along with a sturdy footman to keep Ramses out of trouble. This is Ramses' first trip to Egypt, after studying and hearing about it for all his young life.

Ramses got off his donkey. Squatting, he began to sift through the debris...[He] held up an object that looked like a broken branch. "It is a femuw," he said in a trembling voice. "Excuse me, Mama - a femur, I meant to say." [...]

Ramses rose obediently. The warm breeze of the desert ruffled his hair. His eyes glowed with the fervor of a pilgrim who has finally reached the Holy City. (TMC, chapter 5)

While in Cairo, Amelia hears rumors of a scrap of papyrus which no one will confess to owning, but which has the local antiquities dealers living in fear of the man who is after it.

No sooner does the family settle in near their dig than they are paid a visit by a group of American missionaries who have set up shop nearby, then the rival archaeologist who did get permission to dig at Dahshoor, then a German noblewoman with more money than taste...and then a thief who steals one of the objects the Emersons find at Mazghunah, a mummy case.

Reviews
Kirkus Reviews found this novel to have period ambience and ironic comedy, written with “a crisp sense of style that rarely flags.”

References

External links
Brief description of the pyramids at Mazghuna

 The Peabody-Emerson Excavations 1884-1923 

1985 American novels
Amelia Peabody
Novels set in Egypt
Fiction set in 1894
Fiction set in 1895
Novels set in the 1890s
Historical mystery novels